The Ascodesmidaceae are a family of fungi in the order Pezizales.

References

Pezizales
Ascomycota families
Taxa named by Joseph Schröter
Taxa described in 1893